Malcolm Claiborne (1838–1870), sometimes spelled Claiborn, was an elected representative in the Georgia Legislature. An African American, he along with 25 of 29 African Americans elected in Georgia in 1868 were denied seats by their white colleagues. After federal intervention they were allowed to take office in 1870. Claiborne was shot and killed the same year in a dispute with the messenger sent by the Georgia House, Moses H. Bentley, who had been a black delegate to the Constitutional Convention, in a heated dispute over the pay of House pages. Claiborne is believed to be buried at the Oakland Cemetery (Atlanta), although the exact location of his grave is unknown.

References

1838 births
1870 deaths
African-American state legislators in Georgia (U.S. state)
Original 33
African-American politicians during the Reconstruction Era
Members of the Georgia House of Representatives
19th-century American politicians